Out of Style is the third studio album by Finnish rock band Sunrise Avenue. It was released on 25 March 2011 by Universal Music.

Track listing
 "Hollywood Hills"
 "Damn Silence"
 "Somebody Help Me"
 "I Don't Dance"
 "I Gotta Go"
 "Stormy End"
 "Kiss Goodbye"
 "Sex & Cigarettes"
 "The Right One"
 "Out of Tune"
 "Angels on a Rampage"
 "Sweet Symphony"

Charts

Weekly charts

Year-end charts

References

Sunrise Avenue albums
2011 albums
Universal Music Group albums